Uhrich is a surname. Notable people with the surname include:

Andy Uhrich, American mixed martial artist
Jean-Jacques Uhrich (1802–1886), French general
John Michael Uhrich (1877–1951), Canadian politician
Kathryn Uhrich (born 1965), American chemical engineer

See also
Ulrich